Harold W. Tower (July 17, 1911 – August 12, 1994) was an American rower who competed in the 1932 Summer Olympics. In 1932, he won the gold medal as member of the American boat in the eights competition.

References

External links
 
 
 
 

1911 births
1994 deaths
American male rowers
Rowers at the 1932 Summer Olympics
Olympic gold medalists for the United States in rowing
Medalists at the 1932 Summer Olympics